Terry Domburg (born 11 July 1960) is a former Australian rules footballer who played with Collingwood in the Victorian Football League (VFL).

Domburg was recruited from South Warrnambool and played seven games for Collingwood in 1980. The last of those was an elimination final, which he started from the bench. Collingwood won that match and went on to play in the grand final, but Domburg wasn't selected for the rest of the finals series.

He also didn't play senior football at Collingwood in 1981 but made six appearances in the 1982 VFL season.

References

1960 births
Australian rules footballers from Victoria (Australia)
Collingwood Football Club players
South Warrnambool Football Club players
Living people